Pneumatolysis is an obsolete geologic term for magma emitting gasses that alter surrounding rock or crystallize minerals. Pneumatolysis is now considered a type of hydrothermal interaction.

See also
 Metasomatism

References

Further reading 
  Philip Lake and R. H. Rastall. A textbook of geology (1920). 3rd ed. Edward Arnold: London.  pp. 251-255 describes pneumatolysis, especially in granites. 
 McGraw-Hill Encyclopedia of the Geological Sciences.  Second edition. New York: McGraw-Hill, 1987. p. 518

External links
 

Igneous petrology
Metamorphic petrology
Obsolete geology theories
Geological processes